The Pakistan Mission Control Center (Call sign:PMCC) is a separate command and control and separate mission control center at the Suparco Headquarters in Karachi, Pakistan.  The PMCC manages and controls the satellite programme of Pakistan, and controls the nation's unmanned space programme.

Historical review

The facility came into existence in 1990 with the technical support of France, Canada and the Soviet Union.  Since 1990, Pakistan had been participating in an international and multinational humanitarian programme for satellite–aided search and rescue, the International Cospas-Sarsat Programme. In 1990, the Government of Pakistan accorded approval for Suparco's participation in the Cospas program as ground segment provider and lead space station with close coordination with the Soviet Union. Over the years, the mission control center had equipped itself with advanced technology and is capable of controlling the capable COSPAS-SARSAT satellites.

Operational activities

The PMCC is a major facility to hold the space programme activities and to control the satellite programme. On November 10-November 12, 2009 at 0500 - 1300 UTC, Suparco successfully completed commissioning and telecommunication test of the Pakistan Mission Control Center under the officials of the COSPAS-SARSAT International Program, for the support of Search and Rescue using satellite aided tracking technology. As of current, the PMCC is a recognized and major facility of the International COSPAS-SARSAT Program.

References

International research institutes
Research institutes in Pakistan
1990 establishments in Pakistan
Space and Upper Atmosphere Research Commission
 
Science and technology in Pakistan
Canada–Pakistan relations
France–Pakistan relations
Pakistan–Soviet Union relations
Pakistan federal departments and agencies
SUPARCO facilities